The North East Party (NEP) is a regionalist political party in North East England founded in 2014 by 16 people including the former Labour MP Hilton Dawson and 7 members of the FAIR party. The party campaigns for a better deal for North East England generally and is committed to a devolved assembly in the North East with powers similar to those in Wales, Scotland and Northern Ireland, if approved by a referendum. It says bodies such as the North East Combined Authority do not have a mandate to take on new responsibilities and representatives must be directly-elected. Dawson stepped down as Chair of the party in June 2016 and was replaced by John Tait. Dawson remains active in the party taking on the role of Secretary and Nominating Officer.

The party has two elected councillors above parish council level, all on Durham County Council.

History 
The NEP was founded in May 2014 and is widely seen as a sister party to the Yorkshire Party. In December 2014, the party won its first council seat at a local by-election for Peterlee Town Council in County Durham. Two months later, the party won a second seat on the council in another by-election. Following these successes, the party contested and won several by-elections for both Durham County and local parish council seats during 2015-17.

In its first general election in 2015 the North East Party contested four parliamentary seats, standing candidates in Easington, Newcastle upon Tyne North, Redcar and Stockton North. Its best performance came in Easington where candidate Susan McDonnell came in fifth of seven candidates and received 2.3% of the vote.

In the May 2017 Durham County local government elections, the party stood 14 county councillor candidates and 27 town councillor candidates. Its candidates won 3 seats on Durham County Council (2 seats for Peterlee West, 1 seat for Passfield) and 23 seats on Durham County town councils including 20 of 22 seats at Peterlee Town Council, 2 of 8 north ward seats at Horden Parish Council, and 1 of 15 seats at Shotton Parish Council.

In the 2017 general election the party ran in only one constituency, Easington. Susan McDonnell nearly tripled her vote total from 2015, saved her deposit with 6.6% of the vote, and came in third place ahead of the UKIP, Liberal Democrat, and Green candidates.

The party stood two candidates in the 2019 general election.

The party nominated its founding member Hilton Dawson in Hartlepool for the first parliamentary by-election of the 2020s. He came in tenth place.

At the 2021 local elections, the party retained two of its councillors on Durham County Council in Passfield and Peterlee West wards. Despite losing their second seat in the latter ward, they gained both seats being contested in Peterlee East, thus bringing them to four councillors in total.

List of chairs

See also 
 Yorkshire Party, a regional party calling for a Yorkshire Parliament
 Northern Party, a defunct regional party that was based in Lancashire
 Northern Independence Party, a secessionist party founded in 2020

References

External links 
 

Home rule in the United Kingdom
Political parties established in 2014
Regionalist parties in the United Kingdom
2014 establishments in England